This list of museums in Illinois contains museums which are defined for this context as institutions (including nonprofit organizations, government entities, and private businesses) that collect and care for objects of cultural, artistic, scientific, or historical interest and make their collections or related exhibits available for public viewing. Also included are non-profit and university art galleries. Museums that exist only in cyberspace (i.e., virtual museums) are not included.

Museums

Defunct museums
 ABA Museum of Law, Chicago, closed in 2011
 African-American Heritage Museum and Black Veterans Archives, Aurora, former sculpture park dedicated to the leaders of Black American history, closed in 2000. Relocated to Hammonds, LA.
 American Police Center & Museum, Chicago
 Americana Hollywood Museum, Metropolis
 ArtWorks Children's Museum, Ingleside
 Barb City Motorcycle Museum, DeKalb, collection sold in 2013
 Chester Gould-Dick Tracy Museum, Woodstock, closed in 2008, collection now online
 Gardner Museum of Architecture & Design, Quincy
 Illinois Museum of Natural History, campus of Illinois State University, Old Main building, from 1857-1877
 Lakeview Museum of Arts & Sciences, Peoria, closed in 2012, collections now at the Peoria Riverfront Museum
 Max Nordeen's Wheels Museum, Woodhull
 McCormick Tribune Freedom Museum, Chicago, closed in 2009
 Motorola Museum of Electronics, Schaumburg
 Museum of Funeral Customs, Springfield, closed in 2009
 Museum of Holography, Chicago 
 National Museum of Surveying, Springfield, closed in 2013
 Octave Chanute Aerospace Museum, Rantoul, closed in 2015
 Old Barn Museum, Newark
 Oliver Parks Telephone Museum, Springfield
 Park Ridge Historical Society Museum, Park Ridge
 The Peace Museum, Chicago
 Raggedy Ann & Andy Museum, Arcola, Raggedy Ann and Raggedy Andy memorabilia, Johnny Gruelle exhibits closed in 2009
 Shea's Gas Station Museum, Springfield, contents auctioned off in 2015
 Smith Museum of Stained Glass Windows, Chicago, closed in 2014
 Stuka Military Museum, Oregon
 Terra Museum, Chicago, closed on October 31, 2004 
 Under the Prairie Frontier Archaeological Museum, Athens, operated by the Sangamo Archaeological Center, closed August 1, 2008
 U.S. Senator Paul Simon Museum, Troy, closed in 2012
 Vinegar Hill Historic Lead Mine & Museum, Galena
 Walter Payton Museum, Aurora, part of a restaurant complex that closed in 2010

See also
 List of museums and cultural institutions in Chicago
 List of nature centers in Illinois

References

External links

Illinois Association of Museums

Illinois

Illinois education-related lists
Lists of buildings and structures in Illinois
Tourist attractions in Illinois